"Not a Second Time" is a song by English rock band the Beatles. It was written by John Lennon, though credited to the Lennon–McCartney partnership. It was first released on the Beatles second British album, With the Beatles, and their second American album  Meet the Beatles!. Lennon said he was "trying to write a Smokey Robinson or something at the time." The song was recorded in nine takes on 11 September 1963 at EMI Studios.

Musical structure
This song inspired a musical analysis from William Mann of The Times, citing the "Aeolian cadence" (Aeolian harmony) of Lennon's vocals as the song draws to a close, and noting that the same chord progression appears at the end of the final movement of Gustav Mahler's Das Lied von der Erde. Lennon, years later, remarked: "To this day, I have no idea what [Aeolian cadences] are. They sound like exotic birds." The actual meaning of the term "Aeolian cadence" is that a major key song resolves on the vi chord, which is the tonic chord of the relative minor key. The term derives from the fact that the Aeolian mode is rooted on the sixth step of the major scale.

Dominic Pedler considers the "Aeolian cadence" moment to occur at the end of this line: (Am) "You hurt me then. You're back again. No/(Bm) no no/(D7) not a second time"/(Em). Pedler writes: "We are expecting the D7 chord, the dominant in the key of G, to return to the G major tonic". However, in replacing it with an Em chord supporting an isolated E note on "time", we have an interrupted cadence or dominant-to-relative sub-minor (V7 to vi) shift. The major key of the song is G, but it appears to resolve on the Em (vi) chord. As Allan Moore puts it, "Mann would argue that it is not the same thing as a 'V-vi' Interrupted or Deceptive cadence because—at that precise point in the song—the role of the E minor as a 'vi' is being questioned and is veering towards tonic status."

Pedler notes that another interesting moment in the song is that George Martin's piano part alternates not between G and E minor, but G and E major, the presence of the piano's extra G# (the major 3rd of the E chord) creating a "grating, tense colouring" in comparison to a G natural of the guitar's Em chord. Pedler's discussion with musical experts about the comparison between this Beatles song and Mahler's "Song of the Earth" revealed that none found anything relevant, except perhaps that Mahler's Farewell movement involves various shades of a C major chord and ends after a flute B-A drop (the A chord being a VI in the chord of C) with the "final sonority" of a C6 (where the C, E and G notes are from the trombones and lower strings and the A from oboe and flute, this final C6 chord seeming to be "printed on the atmosphere", as Benjamin Britten terms it).

Personnel
John Lennon – double-tracked vocal, acoustic guitar
Paul McCartney – bass
George Harrison – acoustic guitar
Ringo Starr – drums
George Martin – producer, piano
Norman Smith – engineer
Personnel per Ian MacDonald

Cover versions
 R. Stevie Moore covered the song in 1978 on his album The North.
 Robert Palmer covered the song in 1980 on his album Clues, adding a second verse featuring new lyrics not in the Beatles version.
 The Pretenders covered the song in 1990 as a bonus track on the Sense of Purpose single.
 The Smithereens on their 2007 album Meet The Smithereens!.
 Rosanne Cash included the song on some international versions of her 1979 Columbia debut Right or Wrong.

In popular culture
Stephen King makes reference to this song in Doctor Sleep, his 2013 sequel to The Shining. It is played mysteriously on the piano by a baby in another room.

Notes

References

 
 
 
 

1963 songs
The Beatles songs
Robert Palmer (singer) songs
Song recordings produced by George Martin
Songs written by Lennon–McCartney
Songs published by Northern Songs